Montes Claros is a city located in northern Minas Gerais state, in Brazil. It was made a seat of a municipality in 1831 and attained city status in 1857.

History

The first Portuguese settlers arrived in this region during the eighteenth century.
In 1707 they formed three great ranches: Jaiba, Olhos d'Água and Montes Claros.
The latter was created by Antônio Gonçalves Figueira.
In order to get his cattle to market Figueira opened up roads to Tranqueiras in Bahia and to the São Francisco River
Soon the Fazenda de Montes Claros became the greatest producer of cattle in the north of Minas Gerais,
and a small village was formed.
In 1554 the Espinosa-Navarro expedition, composed of twelve Bandeirantes.
The settlers moved north from the coast in search of diamonds and gold in the streams,
and to conquer the region from the native Amerindians.
It was officially founded in 1768 with as Arraial de Formigas.Later it would be renamed to Arraial de Nossa Senhora da Conceição and São José de Formigas. 
In 1810 the town was made a bishopric. In 1831 the settlement had grown to a village and was renamed to Vila de Montes Claros de Formigas.
In 1847 the first doctor arrived and set up practice.  
By 1857, Vila Montes Claros de Formigas had around 2,000 inhabitants and became the city of Montes Claros.

The 20th century brough fast development to the city.
In 1912 the first telephone line was installed. In 1914 the first cinema (Cinema Recreio) was created.
Electricity arrives in 1917. The first automobile arrives in 1920.
In 1926 the first railroad service starts to operate.
In 1938 the city implements a drinking water system.
Finally in 1956 the city is connected to the national telephone system.

Geography
According to the modern (2017) geographic classification by Brazil's National Institute of Geography and Statistics (IBGE), the city is the main municipality in the Intermediate Geographic Region of Montes Claros.

Neighboring municipalities 
North: São João da Ponte
Northeast: Capitão Enéas
East: Francisco Sá
Southeast: Juramento, Glaucilândia
South: Bocaiúva
Southwest: Claro dos Poções
West: São João da Lagoa, Coração de Jesus
Northwest:  Mirabela,  Patis

Microregion of Montes Claros
Montes Claros is also a statistical microregion (number 36) consisting of 22 municipalities: Brasília de Minas, Campo Azul, Capitão Enéas, Claro dos Poções, Coração de Jesus, Francisco Sá, Glaucilândia, Ibiracatu, Japonvar, Juramento, Lontra, Luislândia, Mirabela, Montes Claros, Patis, Ponto Chique, São João da Lagoa, São João da Ponte, São João do Pacuí, Ubaí, Varzelândia, and Verdelândia.

Distances
BR 135 – Bocaiúva/Januária
BR 365 – Pirapora/Uberlândia
BR 251 – Rio-Bahia/Salinas/Coração de Jesus
BR 122 – Janaúba

Climate
The vegetation of the municipality is mainly Cerrado with areas of transition between cerrado and Caatinga.

Economy

Primary sector:
Producer of dairy and beef cattle, followed by agriculture:  beans, corn, manioc, cotton, and irrigated rice.
Secondary sector:
The industrial sector began to increase with the arrival of electric power in 1965 and the participation of the government agency SUDENE in the industrial development of the region.  Today industry is the main activity in the city.  The factories installed are, among others, the largest factory of condensed milk in the world (Nestlé), one of the three factories of insulin in Latin America (BIOBRAS now Novo Nordisk Produção Farmacêutica do Brasil), a modern textile factory (COTENOR), and the seventh largest cement factory in Brazil (LAFARGE BRASIL)

Montes Claros is also recognized nationally as the capital of Carne de Sol, a local jerky-like dry beef and Arroz com Pequi, a very popular meal that is made of rice and Pequi.
According to CAGED (Cadastro Geral de Empregados e Desempregados), Montes Claros is ranked #3 in the list of the cities of the state of Minas Gerais in number of employed people, only behind Belo Horizonte and Uberlândia.

Education and health
Several higher education institutions are located in Montes Claros. There are three public universities: Universidade Estadual de Montes Claros (Unimontes), Instituto Federal do Norte de Minas Gerais (IFNMG) and a campus of the Universidade Federal de Minas Gerais (UFMG), and five private colleges: Universidade Paulista (UNIP), Universidade Norte do Paraná (Unopar), Faculdades Pitágoras, Faculdades Unidas do Norte de Minas (FUNORTE), Faculdade de Ciência e Tecnologia de Montes Claros (Facit), Faculdade de Saúde Ibituruna (Fasi), and Faculdades Santo Agostinho.

In 2005 there were 1 public and 2 private hospitals with 996 beds. There were also 62 public and 78 private clinics.

Transportation

Airport
Mário Ribeiro Airport has a runway with capability to receive planes as large as Boeing 737.  It has a navigation system and a rescue and fire combat system.  There are 8 daily flights to Belo Horizonte.

Tourism

Montes Claros has innumerous caves and 164 cataloged archaeological sites, among which the most important are the caves of Lapa Grande, where there is an underground river with a length of more than one kilometers.  Lapa Grande is located in the Serra da Vieira,  from Montes Claros.

In the city itself there are several large parks, among which the most important are Parque Municipal Milton Prates, with a lake and zoo.  In the rural area there is Parque Sapucaia, a forest reserve and Parque Guimarães Rosa along the banks of the Córrego Carrapato.

Notable people
 Ronildo Pereira de Freitas (born 1977), football player
 Darcy Ribeiro, anthropologist
 Yara Tupynambá (born 1932), artist
 Barbara Fialho, model
 Beto Guedes, singer, guitar player and composer
 Cyro dos Anjos, journalist, author

References

External links
City Hall of Montes Claros website
Government of the State of Minas Gerais website
Citybrazil

Municipalities in Minas Gerais